A  list of earliest films produced in Azerbaijan SSR ordered by year of release in the 1960s:

Films:1918-1990 see also List of Soviet films

1960

1961-

External links
 Azerbaijani film at the Internet Movie Database
 Azerbaycan Kinosu

1960
Lists of 1960s films
Films